Johan Birger Matias Kvarnström is a Finnish politician currently serving in the Parliament of Finland for the Social Democratic Party of Finland at the Uusimaa constituency.

References

Living people
Members of the Parliament of Finland (2019–23)
Social Democratic Party of Finland politicians
21st-century Finnish politicians
Year of birth missing (living people)